The William Waller House is a historic house located at 1012 N. Dearborn St. in the Near North Side neighborhood of Chicago, Illinois. The home was built in 1875–76, shortly after the Great Chicago Fire, during the development of Chicago's prosperous Gold Coast district. The house's Italianate design features a stone exterior, a double bay front, a bracketed and ornamented cornice, arched windows, and decorative keystones. Though Italianate rowhouses are still common in the Near North Side, freestanding Italianate homes are relatively rare, and the Waller House is one of the best-preserved examples of these homes.

The house was added to the National Register of Historic Places on November 21, 1980.

References

Houses completed in 1872
Houses on the National Register of Historic Places in Chicago
Italianate architecture in Illinois
Villas in the United States